João Paulo Garcia Vieira (born 20 February 1976) is a Portuguese racewalker.

He placed tenth for Portugal at the 2004 Summer Olympics in the 20 km walk and third at the 2006 European Championships.  At the 2012 Summer Olympics he finished in 11th in the 20 km walk.
He became, at 43, the oldest medalist ever at the 2019 World Athletics Championships, finishing second at the 50 km race walk. In 2021, he placed 5th at the 2020 Summer Olympics in the men's 50 kilometres walk and set a season best.

His twin brother Sérgio Vieira is a race walker as well.

Achievements

References

External links

1976 births
Living people
Portuguese male racewalkers
Athletes (track and field) at the 2004 Summer Olympics
Athletes (track and field) at the 2008 Summer Olympics
Athletes (track and field) at the 2012 Summer Olympics
Athletes (track and field) at the 2016 Summer Olympics
Athletes (track and field) at the 2020 Summer Olympics
Olympic athletes of Portugal
Portuguese twins
Twin sportspeople
European Athletics Championships medalists
World Athletics Championships athletes for Portugal
World Athletics Championships medalists
People from Portimão
Sportspeople from Faro District